Federal elections were held in Germany on 22 September 2002 to elect the members of the 15th Bundestag. Incumbent Chancellor Gerhard Schröder's centre-left "red-green" governing coalition retained a narrow majority, and the Social Democratic Party (SPD) retained their status as the largest party in the Bundestag by three seats.

Issues and campaign

Several issues dominated the campaign, with the opposition CDU/CSU attacking the government's performance on the economy which fell back into recession due to the Telecoms crash and the introduction of the euro, as well as campaigning on family values and against taxes (particularly on fuel).

In the run up to the election, the CSU/CDU held a huge lead in the opinion polls and Christian Social Union (CSU) leader Edmund Stoiber famously remarked that "...this election is like a football match where it's the second half and my team is ahead by 2–0."

However, event soon overtook Stoiber and the CDU/CSU campaign. The SPD and the Greens were helped by broad support for its opposition to an invasion of Iraq, continued media attention on the CDU funding scandal and by Gerhard Schröder's personal popularity relative to the opposition's candidate for chancellor, Stoiber.

The SPD was also boosted by Schröder's swift response to the August floods in eastern Germany, as compared to Stoiber, who was on vacation and responded late to the events.

With Guido Westerwelle, leader of the Free Democratic Party (FDP), the FDP presented a chancellor candidate for the first time, usually a title reserved for the main election leaders of the SPD and CDU/CSU. This was met with general derision and Westerwelle was excluded from the chancellor television debate, the first one, against which he unsuccessfully sued.

Opinion polling

Results 
Although most opposition parties gained seats, and the result was in doubt for most of the election night, the governing coalition retained a narrow majority. In particular, the SPD was able to partially offset declines in their vote share in the West with an increase in the East, with the PDS falling below both the 5% threshold and the 3-seat threshold, either of which is required to qualify a party for top-up seats. Consequently, the PDS held only two directly elected seats.

Results by state
Second vote (Zweitstimme, or votes for party list)

Constituency seats

List seats

Post-election
The coalition between the SPD and the Greens continued in government, with Schröder as chancellor. However, due to the slim majority in the Bundestag, the governing coalition was not stable.

Notes

References

Further reading

Sources
 The Federal Returning Officer
 Psephos

External links

Federal elections in Germany
Federal election
German federal election